The 1978 NHL Amateur Draft was the 16th NHL Entry Draft. It was hosted at the Queen Elizabeth Hotel in Montreal, Quebec, on June 15, 1978. It was the last draft to be called the "Amateur Draft" before the process was renamed to the NHL Entry Draft in 1979.

The last active player in the NHL from this draft class was Viacheslav Fetisov, who retired after the 1997–98 season.

Selections by round
Below are listed the selections in the 1978 NHL amateur draft.  The Washington Capitals chose to take an extra pick in the first round instead of participating in the Dispersal Draft (Tim Coulis), and were allowed to pick in Cleveland's position in the second round to complete the Bob Girard/Walt McKechnie trade.  The New York Islanders had traded their fourth round selection to Cleveland, so that pick was forfeited.

Club teams are located in North America unless otherwise noted.

Round one

 The Pittsburgh Penguins' first-round pick went to the Philadelphia Flyers as the result of a trade on June 14, 1978 that sent Tom Bladon, Orest Kindrachuk and Ross Lonsberry to Pittsburgh in exchange for future considerations (Pittsburgh's eighth-round pick in 1978) and this pick.
 The New York Rangers' first-round pick went to the Philadelphia Flyers as the result of compensation on June 2, 1978 for the right to hire Fred Shero as their new head coach. Philadelphia received this pick as compensation for the hire.
 The Los Angeles Kings' first-round pick went to the Montreal Canadiens as the result of a trade on June 12, 1976 that sent Glenn Goldup and a third-round pick in 1978 to Los Angeles in exchange for a third-round pick in 1977 and this pick.
 The Toronto Maple Leafs' first-round pick went to the Detroit Red Wings as the result of a trade on March 13, 1978 that sent Dan Maloney and a second-round pick in 1980 to Toronto in exchange for Errol Thompson, a second-round pick in 1978, a first-round pick in 1980 and this pick.
 The Washington Capitals chose to take an extra pick in the first round instead of participating in the Dispersal Draft.  They were awarded pick #18.

Round two

 The St. Louis Blues' second-round pick went to the Toronto Maple Leafs as the result of a compensation to Toronto with cash from St. Louis for  restricted free agent Rod Seiling on September 9, 1976.
 The Cleveland Barons' second-round pick went to the Washington Capitals as the result of a trade on December 9, 1977 that sent Walt McKechnie to Cleveland in exchange for Bob Girard and this pick.
 The Washington Capitals chose to take an extra pick in the first round instead of participating in the Dispersal Draft and were allowed to pick in Cleveland's position in the second round to complete the trade.
 The Colorado Rockies' second-round pick went to the Minnesota North Stars as the result of a trade on December 9, 1975 that sent the rights to Henry Boucha to Kansas City in exchange for this pick.  The Kansas City Scouts relocated to become the Colorado Rockies for the 1976–77 NHL season.
 The Philadelphia Flyers' second-round pick went to the Colorado Rockies as the result of a trade on June 15, 1978 that sent Colorado's second-round pick in 1979 in exchange for this pick.
 Philadelphia previously acquired this pick as the result of a trade on September 29, 1976 that sent Dave Schultz to Los Angeles in exchange for a fourth-round pick in 1977 and this pick.
 The Atlanta Flames' second-round pick went to the Montreal Canadiens as the result of a trade on May 15, 1973 that sent Montreal's two first-round pick (#2 - Tom Lysiak and #16 - Vic Mercredi) and second-round pick (Eric Vail) in 1973 NHL Amateur Draft to Atlanta in exchange for Atlanta's first-round pick ((#5 - STL - John Davidson) in the 1973 NHL Amateur Draft, first-round pick in the 1977 NHL Amateur Draft (Mark Napier) and this pick.
 The Toronto Maple Leafs' second-round pick went to the Detroit Red Wings as the result of a trade on March 13, 1978 that sent Dan Maloney and a second-round pick in 1980 to Toronto in exchange for Errol Thompson, a first-round pick in 1978, a first-round pick in 1980 and this pick.

Round three

 The Minnesota North Stars' third-round pick went to the Philadelphia Flyers as the result of a trade on October 28, 1977 that sent Harvey Bennett Jr. to Minnesota in exchange for Blake Dunlop and this pick.
 The Pittsburgh Penguins' third-round pick went to the Montreal Canadiens as the result of a trade on August 11, 1976 that sent Don Awrey to Pittsburgh in exchange for this pick.
 The Los Angeles Kings' third-round pick went to the New York Rangers as the result of a trade on August 31, 1977 that sent the rights to Pete Stemkowski to Los Angeles in exchange for future considerations.  The future considerations became this pick.
 The Detroit Red Wings' third-round pick went to the Washington Capitals as the result of a trade on August 17, 1977 that sent the rights to Ron Low and a third-round pick in 1979 to Detroit in exchange for Walt McKechnie, a second-round pick in 1979 and this pick.
 The Los Angeles Kings' third-round pick went to the Detroit Red Wings as the result of a trade on January 9, 1978 that sent Danny Grant to Los Angeles in exchange for the rights to Barry Long and this pick.
Los Angeles previously acquired this pick as the result of a trade with Montreal on June 12, 1976 that sent a third-round pick in 1977 and a first-round pick in  1978 in exchange for Glenn Goldup and this pick.

Round four

 The St. Louis Blues' fourth-round pick went to the Vancouver Canucks as the result of a trade on June 12, 1978 that sent Mike Walton to St. Louis in exchange for future considerations and this pick.
 Draft pick forfeited by the Islanders due to Barons-North Stars merger on June 14, one day prior to the 1978 NHL Amateur Draft.
 Originally, the Cleveland Barons' fourth-round pick would have gone to the New York Islanders as the result of a trade on January 10, 1978 that sent Jean-Paul Parise, Jean Potvin Wayne Merrick, and the Islanders' fourth-round pick in the 1978 NHL Amateur Draft to Cleveland in exchange for Wayne Merrick, Darcy Regier and this pick.
 The Pittsburgh Penguins' fourth-round pick went to the New York Rangers as the result of a trade on October 8, 1976 that sent Dunc Wilson to  Pittsburgh in exchange for this pick.
 The Los Angeles Kings' fourth-round pick went to the Pittsburgh Penguins as the result of a trade on November 2, 1977 that sent Syl Apps Jr. and Hartland Monahan to Los Angeles in exchange for Gene Carr, Dave Schultz and this pick.
 Draft pick not exercised by Cleveland due to Barons-North Stars merger on June 14, one day prior to the 1978 NHL Amateur Draft.
 Originally, the New York Islanders fourth-round pick would have gone to the Cleveland Barons' as the result of a trade on January 10, 1978 that sent Wayne Merrick, Darcy Regier and Cleveland's fourth-round pick in the 1978 NHL Amateur Draft to the Islanders in exchange for Jean-Paul Parise, Jean Potvin and this pick.

Round five

 The Vancouver Canucks' fifth-round pick went to the Colorado Rockies as the result of a trade on September 12, 1976 that sent Colorado's  fourth-round pick in 1977 NHL Amateur Draft to Vancouver in exchange for this pick.

Round six

 The Pittsburgh Penguins' sixth-round pick went to the Toronto Maple Leafs as the result of a trade on June 13, 1978 that sent Randy Carlyle and George Ferguson to Pittsburgh in exchange for Dave Burrows and this pick.

Round seven

 The Pittsburgh Penguins' seventh-round pick went to the St. Louis Blues as the result of a trade on June 15, 1978 that sent cash to Pittsburgh in exchange for this pick.

Round eight

 The Pittsburgh Penguins' eighth-round pick went to the Philadelphia Flyers as the result of a trade on June 14, 1978 that sent Tom Bladon, Orest Kindrachuk and Ross Lonsberry to Pittsburgh in exchange for Pittsburgh's first-round pick in 1978 and future considerations (this pick).

Round nine

 The Pittsburgh Penguins' ninth-round pick went to the St. Louis Blues as the result of a trade on June 15, 1978 that sent cash to Pittsburgh in exchange for this pick.

Round ten

 The Pittsburgh Penguins' tenth-round pick went to the St. Louis Blues as the result of a trade on June 15, 1978 that sent cash to Pittsburgh in exchange for this pick.
 The Buffalo Sabres' tenth-round pick went to the Philadelphia Flyers as the result of a trade on June 15, 1978 that sent cash to Buffalo in exchange for this pick.
 The Boston Bruins' tenth-round pick went to the St. Louis Blues as the result of a trade on June 15, 1978 that sent cash to Boston in exchange for this pick.

Round eleven

 The Pittsburgh Penguins' eleventh-round pick went to the St. Louis Blues as the result of a trade on June 15, 1978 that sent cash to Pittsburgh in exchange for this pick.
 The Toronto Maple Leafs' eleventh-round pick went to the St. Louis Blues as the result of a trade on June 15, 1978 that sent cash to Toronto in exchange for this pick.
 The Buffalo Sabres' eleventh-round pick went to the Philadelphia Flyers as the result of a trade on June 15, 1978 that sent cash to Buffalo in exchange for this pick.
 The Boston Bruins' eleventh-round pick went to the St. Louis Blues as the result of a trade on June 15, 1978 that sent cash to Boston in exchange for this pick.

Round twelve
Ladislav Svozil was the first Czechoslovakian player drafted in the history of the NHL Draft. The Red Wings selected Svozil in the 12th round. Bernhardt Engelbrecht was the first German player drafted in the history of the NHL Draft. The Flames selected him in the 12th round.

 The Vancouver Canucks' twelfth-round pick went to the Washington Capitals as the result of a trade on June 15, 1978 that sent cash to Vancouver in exchange for this pick.
 The Pittsburgh Penguins' twelfth-round pick went to the St. Louis Blues as the result of a trade on June 15, 1978 that sent cash to Pittsburgh in exchange for this pick.
 The Chicago Black Hawks' twelfth-round pick went to the Philadelphia Flyers as the result of a trade on June 15, 1978 that sent cash to Chicago in exchange for this pick.
 The Toronto Maple Leafs' twelfth-round pick went to the St. Louis Blues as the result of a trade on June 15, 1978 that sent cash to Toronto in exchange for this pick.
 The Boston Bruins' twelfth-round pick went to the St. Louis Blues as the result of a trade on June 15, 1978 that sent cash to Boston in exchange for this pick.

Round thirteen

 The Pittsburgh Penguins' thirteenth-round pick went to the St. Louis Blues as the result of a trade on June 15, 1978 that sent cash to Pittsburgh in exchange for this pick.
 The Los Angeles Kings' thirteenth-round pick went to the St. Louis Blues as the result of a trade on June 15, 1978 that sent cash to Los Angeles in exchange for this pick.
 The Atlanta Flames' thirteenth-round pick went to the St. Louis Blues as the result of a trade on June 15, 1978 that sent cash to Atlanta in exchange for this pick.
 The Toronto Maple Leafs' thirteenth-round pick went to the St. Louis Blues as the result of a trade on June 15, 1978 that sent cash to Toronto in exchange for this pick.
 The Boston Bruins' thirteenth-round pick went to the St. Louis Blues as the result of a trade on June 15, 1978 that sent cash to Boston in exchange for this pick.

Round fourteen

 The Colorado Rockies' fourteenth-round pick went to the Washington Capitals as the result of a trade on June 15, 1978 that sent cash to Colorado in exchange for this pick.
 The Pittsburgh Penguins' fourteenth-round pick went to the St. Louis Blues as the result of a trade on June 15, 1978 that sent cash to Pittsburgh in exchange for this pick.
 The Los Angeles Kings' fourteenth-round pick went to the St. Louis Blues as the result of a trade on June 15, 1978 that sent cash to Los Angeles in exchange for this pick.
 The Atlanta Flames' fourteenth-round pick went to the St. Louis Blues as the result of a trade on June 15, 1978 that sent cash to Atlanta in exchange for this pick.
 The Toronto Maple Leafs' fourteenth-round pick went to the St. Louis Blues as the result of a trade on June 15, 1978 that sent cash to Toronto in exchange for this pick.

Round fifteen

Round sixteen

Round seventeen

Round eighteen

Round nineteen

Round twenty

Round twenty one

Round twenty two

Draftees based on nationality

Notes

References
HockeyDB 1978 Draft Centre

External links
 1978 NHL Draft list and stats at Hockey-Reference
 1978 NHL Amateur Draft player stats at The Internet Hockey Database

National Hockey League Entry Draft
Draft